Canada competed at the 2020 Winter Youth Olympics in Lausanne, Switzerland that were held on 9 to 22 January 2020.

Medalists
Medals awarded to participants of mixed-NOC teams are represented in italics. These medals are not counted towards the individual NOC medal tally.

Alpine skiing

Boys

Girls

Mixed

Biathlon

Boys

Girls

Mixed

Bobsleigh

Cross-country skiing 

Boys

Girls

Curling

Canada qualified a mixed team of four athletes.

Mixed team

Mixed doubles

Figure skating

Six Canadian figure skaters achieved quota places for Canada based on the results of the 2019 World Junior Figure Skating Championships. Two more Canadian figure skaters achieved quota places at the Pair skating event based on the results of the 2019–20 ISU Junior Grand Prix ranking.

Singles

Couples

Mixed NOC team trophy

Freestyle skiing 

Ski cross

Slopestyle & Big Air

Ice hockey

Boys' tournament 

Summary

Team roster
Justin Cote
Nate Danielson
Dylan Ernst
Adamo Fantilli
Vincent Filion
Pano Fimis
Conor Geekie
Cedrick Guindon
Matthew Jovanovic
Mats Lukas Lindgren
Paul Ludwinski
Tristan Luneau
Denton Mateychuk
Ty Nelson
Matthew Savoie
Antonin Verreault
Noah Warren

Luge

Girls

Mixed team relay

Short track speed skating

Two Canadian skaters achieved quota places for Canada based on the results of the 2019 World Junior Short Track Speed Skating Championships.

Boys

Girls

Skeleton

Ski jumping

Boys

Ski mountaineering

Boys

Girls

Sprint

Mixed

Snowboarding

Snowboard cross

Halfpipe, Slopestyle, & Big Air

See also

Canada at the 2020 Summer Olympics

References

2020 in Canadian sports
Nations at the 2020 Winter Youth Olympics
Canada at the Youth Olympics